Millen High School is a high school in Millen, Georgia.  It was listed on the National Register of Historic Places in 2002.  The listing included two contributing buildings and one non-contributing building.

The present high school serving the area is the Jenkins County High School, in Millen.

The main building was built in 1922, and was designed by Augusta architects Scroggs & Ewing.  It is a two-story T-shaped wood-frame building with a brick veneer.  It has Classical Revival elements.

A second, one-story L-shaped building was built during 1941–1943.  It was started as a Works Progress Administration-funded project, and it served as an elementary school.

A lunchroom building was built in 1962 in between the other two buildings, and linked by covered walkways.

All three buildings in the historic school building complex have been demolished.

Debris from the demolition of the Old Primary School was burned in April 2011.

References

External links
Old Millen High School, GA, with photo of the elementary school

School buildings on the National Register of Historic Places in Georgia (U.S. state)
Neoclassical architecture in Georgia (U.S. state)
School buildings completed in 1922
National Register of Historic Places in Jenkins County, Georgia
High schools in Georgia (U.S. state)
1922 establishments in Georgia (U.S. state)